Fabio Arcella (died 1560) was a Roman Catholic prelate who served as Archbishop of Capua (1549–1560), Bishop of Policastro (1537–1542), Bishop of Bisignano (1530–1535), and Apostolic Nuncio to Naples (1529–1530 and 1535–1537).

Biography
Fabio Arcella was born in Naples, Italy towards the end of the 15th century.
In 1528, he was appointed during the papacy of Pope Clement VII as Apostolic Nuncio to Naples.
On 24 Jan 1530, he was appointed during the papacy of Pope Clement VII as Bishop of Bisignano.
In 1535, he was recalled to Rome and again named Apostolic Nuncio to Naples.
On 5 Mar 1537, he was appointed during the papacy of Pope Paul III as Bishop of Policastro.
He resigned in 1542 and returned to Naples where he again represented the Vatican although without the formal designation as Nuncio.
On 18 Jan 1549, he was appointed during the papacy of Pope Paul III as Archbishop of Capua.
He served as Archbishop of Capua until his death in 1560.

References

External links and additional sources
 (for Chronology of Bishops) 
 (for Chronology of Bishops)  
 (for Chronology of Bishops) 
 (for Chronology of Bishops)  
 (for Chronology of Bishops) 
 (for Chronology of Bishops) 

16th-century Italian Roman Catholic bishops
Bishops appointed by Pope Clement VII
Bishops appointed by Pope Paul III
1560 deaths
Apostolic Nuncios to the Kingdom of Naples